Henry Munnion (21 January 1849 – 24 June 1904) was an English cricketer.  Munnion was a right-handed batsman who bowled left-arm medium pace.  He was born at Ardingly, Sussex.

Munnion made two first-class appearances for Sussex, one in 1877 against Gloucestershire at Clifton College Close Ground and another in 1880 against the touring Australians at the County Ground, Hove.  Against Gloucestershire, Munnion was dismissed for a duck in Sussex's first-innings by W.G. Grace, with the same outcome in Sussex's second-innings.  Gloucestershire won the match by 8 wickets.  Against the Australians, he was dismissed for a duck in Sussex's first-innings by George Palmer, while in the Australians first-innings he took the wickets of Affie Jarvis and Palmer, finishing with figures of 2/15 from 17.3 overs.  In Sussex's second-innings, Munnion wasn't required to bat, with the match ending in a draw.

He died at the village of his birth on 24 June 1904.

References

External links
Henry Munnion at ESPNcricinfo
Henry Munnion at CricketArchive

1849 births
1904 deaths
People from Ardingly
English cricketers
Sussex cricketers